The 2021 WNBA draft was the WNBA's draft for the 2021 WNBA season. A draft lottery was held on December 4, 2020 and the New York Liberty were awarded the first overall pick once again in the draft. The draft was held on April 15, and televised on ESPN in the United States and on TSN2 in Canada at 7:00 p.m. EDT.

Draft lottery

The lottery selection to determine the order of the top four picks in the 2021 draft took place during halftime of the DePaul Blue Demons game against the Louisville Cardinals on December 4, 2020 and was televised on ESPN in the United States and across the TSN Network in Canada. The same four non-playoff teams in 2020 qualified for the lottery drawing: Indiana Fever, Dallas Wings, New York Liberty, and Atlanta Dream.

Lottery chances

The lottery odds were based on combined records from the 2019 and 2020 WNBA seasons. In the drawing, 14 balls numbered 1–14 are placed in a lottery machine and mixed. Four balls are drawn to determine a four-digit combination (only 11–12–13–14 is ignored and redrawn). The team to which that four-ball combination is assigned receives the No. 1 pick. The four balls are then placed back into the machine and the process is repeated to determine the second pick. The two teams whose numerical combinations do not come up in the lottery will select in the inverse order of their two-year cumulative record. Ernst & Young knows the discreet results before they are announced.

The order of selection for the remainder of the first round as well as the second and third rounds was determined by inverse order of the teams' respective regular-season records solely from 2020.

The lottery was won by the New York Liberty, who had the best chance to win the lottery as they did in 2020. The Dallas Wings were awarded the second pick for the second consecutive year, followed by the Atlanta Dream and finally the Indiana Fever. The Liberty would later trade their first pick to the Seattle Storm, who in turn traded it to the Wings. This marks the first time that one team has held the top two picks in the draft in WNBA history.

Eligibility
Under the current collective bargaining agreement (CBA) between the WNBA and its players union, draft eligibility for players not defined as "international" requires the following to be true:
 The player's 22nd birthday falls during the calendar year of the draft. For this draft, the cutoff birth date is December 31, 1999.
 She has either:
 completed her college eligibility;
 received a bachelor's degree, or is scheduled to receive such in the 3 months following the draft; or
 is at least 4 years removed from high school graduation.

A player who is scheduled to receive her bachelor's degree within 3 months of the draft date, and is younger than the cutoff age, is only eligible if the calendar year of the draft is no earlier than the fourth after her high school graduation.

Players with remaining college eligibility who meet the cutoff age must notify the WNBA headquarters of their intent to enter the draft no later than 10 days before the draft date, and must renounce any remaining college eligibility to do so. A separate notification timetable is provided for players involved in postseason tournaments (most notably the NCAA Division I tournament); those players (normally) must declare for the draft within 24 hours of their final game.

"International players" are defined as those for whom all of the following is true:
 Born and currently residing outside the U.S.
 Never "exercised intercollegiate basketball eligibility" in the U.S.

For "international players", the eligibility age is 20, also measured on December 31 of the year of the draft.

For the 2021 draft only, the WNBA and its players union agreed to a modification of the normal eligibility rules. The most significant change is that all otherwise eligible college players who wished to enter the draft, including seniors in 2020–21, had to declare for draft entry. Due to an NCAA ruling that the 2020–21 season, dramatically affected by COVID-19, would not be counted against the college eligibility of any basketball player, every college senior in the 2020–21 season had remaining eligibility. Players who wished to be drafted had to notify the league by email no later than April 1, except for those involved in the 2021 Final Four, who had a 48-hour opt-in window after the completion of their last game instead of the normal 24 hours. Players who had opted in had until midnight on April 10 (0400 UTC, April 11) to opt out. This is similar to special 2021 draft declaration rules announced by the NBA, which also required seniors to opt into the draft.

On April 3, the WNBA announced that 52 college players had opted into the draft. This did not include players from the Final Four teams (Arizona, South Carolina, Stanford, UConn); South Carolina and UConn lost in the semifinals on April 2, while Stanford defeated Arizona in the championship game on April 4. On April 7, the WNBA announced that one of the original 52 players had withdrawn from consideration, and that six additional players had opted into the draft. Four players from the initial list of 52 would opt out by the final deadline of April 11.

 Asheika Alexander, Langston
 Janelle Bailey, North Carolina
 Trinity Baptiste, Arizona
 Kate Cain, Nebraska
 Maya Caldwell, Georgia
 Sierra Campisano, Cal Poly
 DiJonai Carrington, Baylor
 Deja Church, DePaul
 Charli Collier, Texas (age-eligible junior)
 Gaby Connally, Georgia
 Rennia Davis, Tennessee
  Lore Devos, Colorado State
 Chelsea Dungee, Arkansas
 Dana Evans, Louisville
 Kysre Gondrezick, West Virginia
 Aleah Goodman, Oregon State
 Arella Guirantes, Rutgers
 Valerie Higgins, Pacific
  Petra Holešínská, North Carolina
 Jordan Jenkins, UTEP
 Kionna Jeter, Towson
 Akinreh Johnson, Michigan
 Ciera Johnson, Texas A&M
 N'dea Jones, Texas A&M
 Micaela Kelly, Central Michigan
 Natalie Kucowski, Lafayette
 Kasiyahna Kushkituah, Tennessee
 Selena Lott, Marquette
 Natasha Mack, Oklahoma State
  Tiana Mangakahia, Syracuse
 Aari McDonald, Arizona
  Blanca Millán, Maine
  Johanna Muzet, Rhode Island
 Michaela Onyenwere, UCLA
 Chasity Patterson, Kentucky
 Chelsey Perry, UT Martin
 Lindsey Pulliam, Northwestern
  Ivana Raca, Wake Forest
 DiDi Richards, Baylor
 Destiny Slocum, Arkansas
 LaPresha Stanley, Appalachian State
 Tesia Thompson, Southeast Missouri
 Unique Thompson, Auburn
 Jill Townsend, Gonzaga
 Mikayla Vaughn, Notre Dame
 Destinee Walker, Notre Dame
 Jasmine Walker, Alabama
 Stephanie Watts, North Carolina
 Tyra Whitehead, San Jose State
 Kiana Williams, Stanford
 Aaliyah Wilson, Texas A&M
 Jenn Wirth, Gonzaga
 LeeAnne Wirth, Gonzaga

Key

Draft

First round

Second round

Third round

Footnotes

References

Women's National Basketball Association Draft
WNBA draft